Standish, known locally as Standish Corner, is a census-designated place (CDP) in the town of Standish in Cumberland County, Maine, United States. The population was 469 at the 2010 census. It is part of the Portland–South Portland–Biddeford, Maine Metropolitan Statistical Area.

Geography
Standish is located at  (43.7353, -70.5525), at the intersection of Maine State Routes 25 and 35. Route 25 runs west towards New Hampshire and east to Gorham and Portland, while Route 35 travels north towards North Windham and south to Buxton, Hollis and eventually Kennebunk.

Demographics

References

Census-designated places in Maine
Portland metropolitan area, Maine
Census-designated places in Cumberland County, Maine